is a professional Japanese baseball player. He is a pitcher for the Tokyo Yakult Swallows of Nippon Professional Baseball (NPB).

References 

1997 births
Living people
Baseball people from Nara Prefecture
Nippon Professional Baseball pitchers
Tokyo Yakult Swallows players